In Greek mythology, Chelônê (Ancient Greek: Χελώνη from khelônê which means tortoise) was an oread of Mount Khelydorea ("rich in tortoises") in Arkadia.

Mythology

Servius' account 
When all the gods, men, and animals were invited by the divine messenger, Hermes to attend the wedding of Zeus and Hera, the nymph Chelone alone remained at home, to shew her disregard of the solemnity. But Hermes then descended from Olympus, threw Chelone's house, which stood on the bank of a river, together with the nymph, into the water, and transformed her into a lazy tortoise, who had henceforth to carry her house on her back."For his wedding with Juno (Hera), Jupiter (Zeus) ordered Mercurius (Hermes) to invite all the gods, the men and the animals to the wedding. Everyone invited by Mercurius (Hermes) came, except for Chelone who did not deign to be there, mocking the wedding. When Mercurius noticed her absence, he went back down to the earth, threw in the river the house of Chelone that was standing over the river and changed Chelone in an animal that would bear her name. Chelone is said testudo (tortoise) in Latin."

Aesop's account 

The fable tells how the king of the gods invited all the animals to his wedding but the tortoise never arrived. When asked why, her excuse was that she preferred her own home, so Zeus made her carry her house about forever after."Zeus invited all the animals to his wedding. The tortoise alone was absent, and Zeus did not know why, so he asked the tortoise (khelone) her reason for not having come to the feast. The tortoise said, ‘Be it ever so humble, there's no place like home.’ Zeus got angry at the tortoise and ordered her to carry her house with her wherever she went."

Pausanias' account 
"Adjoining Mount Kyllene is another mountain, Khelydorea (Chelydorea), where Hermes is said to have found a tortoise, taken the shell from the beast, and to have made therefrom a harp."

Notes

References 

 Maurus Servius Honoratus, In Vergilii carmina comentarii. Servii Grammatici qui feruntur in Vergilii carmina commentarii; recensuerunt Georgius Thilo et Hermannus Hagen. Georgius Thilo. Leipzig. B. G. Teubner. 1881. Online version at the Perseus Digital Library.
 Pausanias, Description of Greece with an English Translation by W.H.S. Jones, Litt.D., and H.A. Ormerod, M.A., in 4 Volumes. Cambridge, MA, Harvard University Press; London, William Heinemann Ltd. 1918. . Online version at the Perseus Digital Library
 Pausanias, Graeciae Descriptio. 3 vols. Leipzig, Teubner. 1903.  Greek text available at the Perseus Digital Library.

Oreads
Nymphs